Chư Yang Sin National Park (Vietnamese language: Vườn quốc gia Chư Yang Sin) is a national park in the communes of: Yang Mao, Cư Drăm, Cư Pui, Hoà Phong, Hoà Lễ, Hoà Sơn, Khuê Ngọc Điền in the county of Krông Bông and communes: Yang Cao, Bông Krang, Krông Nô, Đắk Phơi of county Lắk, Đắk Lắk Province, Tây Nguyên, Vietnam.

The national park was established according to the Decision number 92/2002/QĐ-TTg dated 12 July 2002, signed by then Prime Minister of Vietnam Nguyễn Tấn Dũng, this decision turned Chư Yang Sin Nature Reserve into Chư Yang Sin National Park.

The only confirmed reports of golden jackals (C.a. cruesemanni) in Vietnam come from Chư Yang Sin National Park.

References

National parks of Vietnam
Geography of Đắk Lắk province
Protected areas established in 2002
2002 establishments in Vietnam